Justice O'Connor may refer to:

Deirdre O'Connor (born 1941), judge of the Federal Court of Australia
Dennis O'Connor (judge) (fl. 1970s–2010s), associate chief justice of Ontario on the Ontario Court of Appeal
Earl Eugene O'Connor (1922–1998), associate justice of the Kansas Supreme Court
Kenneth O'Connor (1896–1985), chief justice of Jamaica and later of Kenya
Maureen O'Connor (born 1951), chief justice of the Supreme Court of Ohio
Richard Edward O'Connor (1851–1912), justice of the High Court of Australia
Sandra Day O'Connor (born 1930), associate justice of the United States Supreme Court

See also
Judge O'Connor (disambiguation)
Justice Connor (disambiguation)